The Cheese is a LPFM (Low Power FM) radio station which broadcasts from Lower Hutt, a region close to Wellington in New Zealand.  The station broadcasts 24 hours a day.  The Cheese is licensed with APRA and PPNZ in New Zealand for music broadcasting rights and operates under the NZ laws governing LPFM transmission.

History
The Cheese commenced broadcasting on Saturday, July 1, 2006, and its original frequency was at 88.4 FM from Wainuiomata.

The station can be heard in Lower Hutt on 87.9 MHz FM with simulcasting via their official website.

Format
The Cheese broadcasts a mix of music from the 80s, 90s, recent and current hits.

External links

References
 City Life Magazine 1 February 2007. Image of article

Radio stations in Wellington
Radio stations established in 2006